Cliniodes ostreonalis, the oystershell metrea moth, is a moth in the family Crambidae. It was described by Augustus Radcliffe Grote in 1882. It is found in North America, where it has been recorded from Connecticut, Indiana, Kentucky, Maine, Maryland, Michigan, New Brunswick, New York, Ohio, Ontario, Pennsylvania, Quebec, Vermont, West Virginia and Wisconsin.

The length of the forewings is 13–16 mm for males and 15–17 mm for females. The forewings are very light yellow with a nebulous, blackish mesial band. The hindwings are white with a purplish iridescence. Adults have been recorded on wing from May to August.

Larvae have been recorded feeding on Rhamnus frangula. They create a web mixed with dead leaves and excrement. Pupation takes place in a yellowish cocoon, mixed with debris and leaves. The species overwinters in the pupal stage.

References

Moths described in 1882
Eurrhypini